Julien Cartron is a Grand Prix motorcycle racer from France.

Career statistics

By season

Races by year

References

External links
  Profile on motogp.com

French motorcycle racers
Living people
1989 births
125cc World Championship riders